Belkov is a Russian masculine surname. Its feminine counterpart is Belkova. Notable people with this surname include:
Gennadiy Belkov (born 1955), Uzbekistani high jumper 
Konstantin Belkov (born 1980), Russian football player
Maxim Belkov (born 1985), Russian road cyclist
Olga Bielkova (born 1975), Ukrainian politician and economist
Vladimir Belkov (born 1941), Russian football coach and a former player

Russian-language surnames